Saint-Firmin-sur-Loire (literally Saint-Firmin on Loire) is a commune in the Loiret department in north-central France.

See also
Communes of the Loiret department

References

Saintfirminsurloire